Francesca Deidda (born 16 January 1992) is an Italian synchronised swimmer. She competed in the team event at the 2016 Summer Olympics. and in Team at the 2020 Summer Olympics. Deidda is an athlete of the Gruppo Sportivo Fiamme Oro.

References

External links
 

1992 births
Living people
Italian synchronized swimmers
Olympic synchronized swimmers of Italy
Synchronized swimmers at the 2016 Summer Olympics
Synchronized swimmers at the 2020 Summer Olympics
World Aquatics Championships medalists in synchronised swimming
Artistic swimmers at the 2019 World Aquatics Championships
European Aquatics Championships medalists in synchronised swimming
European Championships (multi-sport event) bronze medalists
Sportspeople from Cagliari
Artistic swimmers of Fiamme Oro